Zones is an album by Hawkwind released in 1983 consisting of studio demos from 1981 and live performances between 1980 and 1982.

The tracks on side 1 have been included on the 2009 3CD re-issue of Levitation in expanded form.

Track listing

Side 1
"Zones" (Dave Brock) – 0:46
"Dangerous Vision" (Keith Hale) – 5:05
"Running Through the Back Brain" (Michael Moorcock, Brock, Harvey Bainbridge, Huw Lloyd-Langton, Hale, Ginger Baker) – 6:17
"The Island" [aka "Dust of Time"] (Lloyd-Langton, Brock) – 3:17
"Motorway City" (Brock) – 4:57

Side 2
"Utopia 84" (Brock) – 2:06
"Social Alliance" (Brock) – 4:39
"Sonic Attack" (Moorcock, Hawkwind) – 5:47
"Dream Worker" (Bainbridge) – 5:28
"Brainstorm" (Nik Turner) – 8:30

Personnel
Hawkwind
Michael Moorcock – vocals (side 1, track 3)
Dave Brock – electric guitar, keyboards, vocals
Huw Lloyd-Langton – electric guitar, vocals
Harvey Bainbridge – bass guitar, keyboards, vocals
Keith Hale – keyboards, vocals (side 1)
Ginger Baker – drums (side 1)
Martin Griffin – drums (side 2)
Nik Turner – saxophone, flute, vocals (side 2)

Notes
Side 1, tracks 2,3: Battle Studio, 1981
Side 1, tracks 4,5: Lewisham Odeon, 18 December 1980
Side 2: recorded live on the "Choose Your Masques Tour", 1982

Release history
Oct-1983: Flicknife Records, SHARP014, vinyl
Mar-1984: Flicknife Records, PSHARP014, picture disc (2000 copies)
Nov-1988: Flicknife Records, SHARP1422CD, UK CD with first disc from This Is Hawkwind, Do Not Panic
Nov-1992: Anagram Records, CDMGRAM57, UK CD
Jul-1994: Griffin Music, GCDHA164-2, USA CD
Jul-2000: Cleopatra Records, CLE08502, USA 2CD with This Is Hawkwind, Do Not Panic
Jul-2002: Anagram Records, CDMGRAM160, UK 2CD with This Is Hawkwind, Do Not Panic

References

Hawkwind compilation albums
1983 compilation albums